Lagonisi (Greek: Λαγονήσι) may refer to the following places in Greece:

Lagonisi, a seaside residential area of the municipality of Saronikos, Attica
Lagonisi (island), an island off the coast of Andros in the Cyclades
Lagonisi, a beach village near Agios Nikolaos, Chalkidiki